Giacomo Bernardi is a Professor of Ecology and Evolutionary Biology at University of California Santa Cruz.  
He earned his B.A., M.S., and Ph.D. at the University of Paris and did post-doctoral work from 1991 to 1994 at Hopkins Marine Station at Stanford University.

His research includes working on phylogeography, speciation and molecular ecology of fishes, particularly in fishes lacking a pelagic larval phase, Gulf of California and Pacific disjunct species, and in surfperches (Embiotocidae).  
His research compares phylogeographic and gene expression patterns to test for local adaptation in a high gene flow species.   
He is also interested in population structure of coastal and island groupers.  
He also investigates adult population structure and the structure of a new year-class within Sebastes mystinus (blue rockfish) and Sebastes atrovirens (kelp rockfish) over multiple temporal and spatial scales. 
He studies at the Richard Gump South Pacific Research Station.

Selected publications 
Robertson DR, Karg F, de Moura RL, Victor BC, and Bernardi G. 2006. "Mechanisms of speciation and faunal enrichment in Atlantic parrotfishes". Molecular Phylogenetics and Evolution 40: 795-807
Bernardi, G. and J. Lape. 2005. "Tempo and mode of speciation in the Baja California disjunct fish species Anisotremus davidsonii". Molecular Ecology 14: 4085-4096.
Bernardi, G. 2005. "Phylogeography and demography of sympatric sister species, Embiotoca jacksoni and E. lateralis along the California coast: Historical versus ecological factors". Evolution 59 386-394.
Crow, K.D., Kanamoto, Z., and Bernardi, G. 2004. "Molecular phylogeny of the hexagrammid fishes using a multi-locus approach". Molecular Phylogenetics and Evolution 32: 986-997.
Bernardi, G., Bucciarelli, G., Costagliola, D., Robertson, D.R., and Heiser, J.B. 2003. "Evolution of coral reef fish Thalassoma spp. (Labridae): 1.Molecular phylogeny and biogeography". Marine Biology 144:369-375.
Costagliola, D., Robertson, D.R., Guidetti, P., Stefanni, S., Wirtz, P., Heiser, J.B., and Bernardi, G. 2003. "Evolution of the coral reef fish Thalassoma spp. (Labridae): 2. Evolution of the eastern Atlantic species". Marine Biology 144:377-383.
Bernardi, G., Holbrook, S.J., Schmitt, R.J., and Crane, N.L. 2003. "Genetic evidence for two distanct clades in a French Ploynesian population of the coral reef three-spot damselfish, Dascyllus trimaculatus". Marine Biology 143:485-490.
Bernardi, G., Findley, L., and Rocha-Olivares, A. 2003. "Vicariance and dispersal across Baja California in disjunct marine fish populations". Evolution 57:1599-1609.
Fauvelot, C., Bernardi, G., Bonhomme, F., and Planes, S. 2003. "Reductions in the mitochondrial DNA diversity of coral reef fish provide evidence of population bottlenecks resulting from Holocene sea-level change", Evolution 57:1571-1583.
Bucciarelli, G., Golani, D., and Bernardi, G. 2002. "Genetic cryptic species as biological invaders: The case of a Lessepsian fish migrant, the hardyhead silverside Atherinomorus lacunosus". J. Exp. Mar. Biol. Ecol 273:143-149.
Bernardi, G., Holbrook, S.J., Schmitt, R.J., Crane, N.L., and DeMartini, E. 2002. "Species boundaries, populations, and colour morphs in the coral reef three-spot damselfish (Dascyllus trimaculatus) species-complex". Proc. Roy. Soc. London 269:599-605.
Planes, S., Doherty, P., and Bernardi, G. 2001. "Unusual case of extreme genetic divergence in a marine fish, Acanthochromis polyacanthus, within the Great Barrier Reef and the Coral Sea". Evolution 55:2263-2273.
Bernardi G., Holbrook S.J., and Schmitt R.J. 2001. "Dispersal of the coral reef three-spot dascyllus, Dascyllus trimaculatus, at three spatial scales". Mar. Biol. 138:457-465.
Huang, D., and Bernardi, G. 2001. "Disjunct Sea of Cortez - Pacific Ocean Gillichthys mirabilis populations and the evolutionary origin of their paedomorphic relative, Gillichthys seta". Mar. Biol. 138:421-428.

References

External links
Giacamo Bernadi profile 
"Giacomo Bernardi", Scientific Commons 

University of California, Santa Cruz faculty
American ecologists
University of Paris alumni
Stanford University alumni
Living people
Year of birth missing (living people)
Marine fauna researchers of the Gulf of California
American expatriates in France